The 19th Kisei was the 19th edition of the Kisei tournament of the board game go, in 1995. Since Cho Chikun won the previous year, he was given an automatic place in the final to defend his title. Sixteen players battled in a single elimination tournament to decide the final 2. Those two would then play each other in a best-of-7 match to decide who would face Cho. Kobayashi Satoru became the challenger after beating Kobayashi Koichi, but lost 4 games to 2 against Cho.

Tournament 

Kisei (Go)
1995 in go